Mirko Bigazzi (born 3 April 1989) is an Italian professional footballer who plays for A.D. Valdinievole Montecatini, as a midfielder.

Career
Born in Cecina, Bigazzi has played in Italy and Portugal for Livorno, Gela and Olhanense.

On 25 July 2013, he moved on loan deal to Olhanense. A year later he moved on another loan, now to Torres 1903.

On 16 September 2015 Bigazzi and Riccardo Regno were signed by Pro Patria.

References

External links

1989 births
Living people
Italian footballers
Italian expatriate footballers
U.S. Livorno 1915 players
S.S.D. Città di Gela players
S.C. Olhanense players
S.E.F. Torres 1903 players
Aurora Pro Patria 1919 players
Serie D players
Serie C players
Serie B players
Primeira Liga players
Italian expatriate sportspeople in Portugal
Expatriate footballers in Portugal
Association football midfielders
Atletico Piombino players